Music of Bill Evans is a studio album by the Kronos Quartet, containing compositions written by or associated with Bill Evans. With Jim Hall (guitar) and Eddie Gómez (bass). Leonard Feather gave the album five stars; Stephen Holden, for the New York Times, named it "Jazz Album of the Week." Reissued with Monk Suite: Kronos Quartet Plays Music of Thelonious Monk on 2CD as 32 Jazz: The Complete Landmark Sessions.

Track listing

See also
List of 1986 albums

References

1986 albums
Kronos Quartet albums
Bill Evans tribute albums